The Midland Railway 6 Class was a class of ten 0-4-4T steam locomotives. They were built at Derby Works in 1875. A development of the earlier 0-4-4WT of the 690 and 780 classes, but being the first Johnson engines, had side tanks instead of back tanks.

The original MR numbers were 6, 15, 18, 137, 140–144 and 147. The 1907 numbers were 1226–1235. All passed to the LMS in 1923, but they were all withdrawn and scrapped by 1935.

An abortive attempt was made to preserve the first of the class (No. 1226, which was withdrawn in 1930) and repainted back into its original livery and renumbered 6. However, new chief mechanical engineer William Stanier ordered it scrapped in 1932.

References 

 An Illustrated Review of Midland Locomotives Volume 3 - Tank Engines by R. J. Essery & D. Jenkinson 

0006 Class
0-4-4T locomotives
Railway locomotives introduced in 1875